Makhul is a Bedouin village in the Negev desert in southern Israel. Located near Tel Arad, it falls under the jurisdiction of al-Kasom Regional Council.

History
The village was established following Government Resolution 881 on 29 September 2003, which created eight new Bedouin settlements (seven of which were to be located in the now defunct Abu Basma Regional Council). After being named Mar'it during the planning states, the village's name was chosen by Bedouins, and is taken from the Cahol stream and Cahol ruins nearby.

References

See also
Bedouin in Israel

Arab villages in Israel
Al-Kasom Regional Council
Populated places established in 2003
Populated places in Southern District (Israel)
2003 establishments in Israel